Chuar may refer to:

 An ethnic group in West Bengal, Jharkhand, Odisha, India; part of the Bhumij people
 A participant in the Chuar rebellion of Bengal Presidency
 Chavar, a city in Iran
 Chuar Group, a geologic group of the United States